Andrea Milani (born December 9, 1980) is an Italian former footballer who played as a defender and current assistant manager of S.S.C. Bari. He made 235 appearances in Serie B.

Coaching career
On 13 April 2016, Milani announced his retirement. He was then hired as a technical coach for U.S. Latina Calcio under manager Vincenzo Vivarini. He left alongside Vivarini in June 2017 and then became his assistant at Empoli F.C. less than a month later. In the summer 2018, he followed Vivarini to Ascoli and became his technical coach once again. Vivarini and his team left Ascoli in the summer 2019 and in September 2019, they was hired at S.S.C. Bari, once again with Milani as his assistant coach.

References

1980 births
Living people
Italian footballers
Association football defenders
Serie B players
Serie C players
S.S.D. Città di Campobasso players
A.S. Cittadella players
Brescia Calcio players
S.S.C. Bari players
U.S. Triestina Calcio 1918 players
A.C. Ancona players
Modena F.C. players
A.C. Mestre players
Latina Calcio 1932 players